Israel competed at the 2020 Winter Youth Olympics in Lausanne, Switzerland from 9 to 22 January 2020. The Israeli delegation consisted 3 athletes who competed in three sports. The alpine ski skier, Noa Szollos, made history when she won Israel's first Olympic winter medals.

Medalists

Alpine skiing

Girls

Figure skating

Israeli figure skaters Hailey Kops and Artem Tsoglin achieved quota places for the Pair Skating event for Israel based on the results of the 2019 World Junior Figure Skating Championships. Israel gave up the quota in the Pair Skating event. However, Israel achieved another quota in the Boys singles event based on Mark Gorodnitsky position in the 2019–20 ISU Junior Grand Prix.

Freestyle skiing

Ski cross

Snowboarding

Snowboard and ski cross relay

See also
Israel at the 2020 Summer Olympics

References

2020 in Israeli sport
Nations at the 2020 Winter Youth Olympics
Israel at the Youth Olympics